Jordan Westerkamp (born June 23, 1994) is a former American football wide receiver. He played college football for Nebraska.

College career
Westerkamp played college football for Nebraska, where he played from 2012 to 2016.  He gained 747 receiving yards as a redshirt sophomore in 2014. In 2015, as a redshirt junior, he amassed 918 yards.  He was selected by both the coaches and media as a second-team player on the 2015 All-Big Ten Conference football team. On November 30, 2016, Westerkamp was named Third-team All-Big Ten by the coaches and media.

Professional career
Westerkamp was signed as an undrafted free agent the Miami Dolphins on July 30, 2017. He was waived with an injury settlement on August 15, 2017. In February 2018, Westerkamp was signed as an international player by the Toronto Argonauts of the CFL. Westerkamp signed with the inaugural  AAF Atlanta Legends in December 2018, but he failed to make the final roster.

Westerkamp signed with the DC Defenders of the XFL during mini-camp in December 2019. He was waived during final roster cuts on January 22, 2020.

References

External links
Nebraska Cornhuskers bio

1994 births
Living people
Players of American football from Illinois
American football wide receivers
Nebraska Cornhuskers football players
Miami Dolphins players
DC Defenders players